William Brae (4 November 1902 – 22 April 1968) was a Scottish footballer who played mainly as an inside left; he spent the majority of his career with Ayr United, making 350 appearances in the Scottish Football League and Scottish Cup over 12 seasons and scoring 104 goals. His best league return was 20 goals from 31 matches in the 1927–28 Scottish Division Two season in which Ayr finished top to gain promotion to Division One, and they remained in the highest tier for the rest of Brae's time at the club. In 1935 he moved on to English football with Swindon Town, subsequently playing in the lower leagues with Cheltenham Town and Evesham Town.

References

1902 births
1968 deaths
Scottish footballers
Petershill F.C. players
Ayr United F.C. players
Swindon Town F.C. players
Cheltenham Town F.C. players
Evesham Town F.C. players
Scottish Football League players
English Football League players
Scottish Junior Football Association players
Footballers from Glasgow
Association football inside forwards